Blood (stylized as Blood: Franz Ferdinand) is a remix album produced by Dan Carey, comprising dub versions of songs from Tonight: Franz Ferdinand, the third studio album by Scottish band Franz Ferdinand. It was first released as a vinyl record for Record Store Day on 18 April 2009, limited to 500 copies, through the Domino Recording Company. It was later released as a CD in June 2009.

Origins and conception
Like Tonight: Franz Ferdinand, Blood is the result of Franz Ferdinand's recording sessions with producer Dan Carey in 2008. It was originally packaged in the deluxe and box-set versions of Tonight: Franz Ferdinand that were available in January 2009 in Europe only. The separately packaged version of Blood  released worldwide features one additional song, "Be Afraid", which is a reworked version of "Dream Again". All of the track titles are taken from lyrics from the original songs, with the exception of "Katherine Hit Me" whose title refers to lyrics from both "No You Girls" and "Katherine Kiss Me".

The songs from Tonight that were not remixed are "Bite Hard", "Lucid Dreams", and "Katherine Kiss Me".

Musical style
Talking about the album and the work of producer Dan Carey, frontman Alex Kapranos stated: "He's coming from that Jamaican perspective — there's much more space; the bass guitar leads a lot more on this record than anything else." This is in reference to the genre choice of Blood which "evolved from reggae, and centers on instrumental remixes of existing recordings".

Track listing

References

Franz Ferdinand (band) albums
2009 remix albums
2009 compilation albums
Domino Recording Company compilation albums
Domino Recording Company remix albums
Albums produced by Dan Carey (record producer)